Canfield Creek is a stream in Fillmore County, located in the U.S. state of Minnesota.

Canfield Creek was named for S. G. Canfield, an early settler.

See also
List of rivers of Minnesota

References

 

Rivers of Fillmore County, Minnesota
Rivers of Minnesota
Southern Minnesota trout streams